The 1962 Nevada Wolf Pack football team represented the University of Nevada during the 1962 NCAA College Division football season. Nevada competed as a member of the Far Western Conference (FWC). The Wolf Pack were led by fourth-year head coach Dick Trachok and played their home games at Mackay Stadium.

Schedule

References

Nevada
Nevada Wolf Pack football seasons
Nevada Wolf Pack football